Caperonotus guianensis is a species of beetle in the family Cerambycidae. It was described by Dalens and Touroult in 2009.

References

Compsocerini
Beetles described in 2009